Katsuhiko Hanada (Japanese: 花田 勝彦; born 12 June 1971 in Kyoto) is a retired Japanese athlete who competed in the long-distance events. He represented his country at two Summer Olympics, in 1996 and 2000.

Competition record

Personal bests
5000 metres – 13:23.49 (Maia 1999)
10,000 metres – 27:45.13 (Sydney 2000)
Half marathon – 1:01:38 (Tokyo 1998)
Marathon – 2:10:02 (1997)

References

1971 births
Living people
Sportspeople from Kyoto
Japanese male long-distance runners
Japanese male marathon runners
Olympic male long-distance runners
Olympic athletes of Japan
Athletes (track and field) at the 1996 Summer Olympics
Athletes (track and field) at the 2000 Summer Olympics
World Athletics Championships athletes for Japan
Japan Championships in Athletics winners
20th-century Japanese people
21st-century Japanese people